Gechi Qeshlaq-e Vosta (also Romanized as Gechī Qeshlāq-e Vosţá; also known as Gechī Qeshlāqī and Kechī Qeshlāqī) is a village in Garamduz Rural District, Garamduz District, Khoda Afarin County, East Azerbaijan Province, Iran. At the 2006 census, its population was 87, in 17 families.

References 

Populated places in Khoda Afarin County